KWNS ( FM) is a radio station broadcasting a Southern Gospel format.  The station is licensed to Winnsboro, Texas, United States, and is owned by Lottie L. Foster.

The letters KWNS were the original call letters of the AM radio station in Pratt, Kansas, when it started in 1962. When the station was acquired by Larry Steckline, the call letters were changed to KWLS to include his initials.  A reunion is being planned for November 2012 to mark the 50th anniversary of radio broadcasting in Pratt.

References

External links 
 
 
 

Franklin County, Texas
Mass media in Wood County, Texas
Southern Gospel radio stations in the United States
WNS